Sibolga Bay (formerly known by the Dutch Baai van Tapanoeli, literally The Bay of Tapanoeli; alternatively Tapanuli Bay) is a natural harbour on the west coast of North Sumatra, Sumatra, Indonesia. It is named after the city of Sibolga which is located inside of the bay.

There are a few islands in the bay, one of which was formerly the site of a fort controlled by the English and the Dutch.

Tsunamis
The area is relatively exposed to tsunamis. An alleged tsunami of November 13, 1925 is debated. The December 26, 2004 Indian Ocean earthquake and tsunami hit the area hard.

References

See also
Sibolga
Central Tapanuli Regency

Sibolga
Bays of Indonesia
Landforms of North Sumatra